Antony (Francis) Trew, (5 June 1906 in Pretoria, South Africa – 12 January 1996 in Chertsey, United Kingdom) was a South African naval officer and writer.

World War II
In World War II he served with the South African and Royal Navies in the Atlantic, the Mediterranean and the Western Approaches. As such he was in command of the escort destroyer HMS Walker. He also served on the Arctic Convoys and was awarded the DSC (Distinguished Service Cross).

Peace time
After World War II he resumed his work with the AA (Automobile Association) of South Africa as Director General.

Bibliography
  Two Hours to Darkness (1963)
  Smoke Island (1964)
  The Sea Break (1966)
  The White Schooner (1969)
  Towards the Tamarind Trees (1970)
  The Moonraker Mutiny (1972)
  Kleber's Convoy (1974)
  The Zhukov Briefing (1975)
  Ultimatum (1976; aka The Soukour Deadline)
  Death of a Supertanker (1978)
  The Antonov Project (1979)
  Sea Fever (1980)
  Running Wild (1982) 
  Bannister's Chart (1984)
  Yashimoto's Last Dive (1986)
  The Chalk Circle (1989)
  The Road to the River and Other Stories (1992)

References

External links
 Obituary

1906 births
1996 deaths
People from Pretoria
Recipients of the Distinguished Service Cross (United Kingdom)
South African male novelists
South African military personnel of World War II
White South African people
20th-century South African novelists
20th-century South African male writers
Royal Navy officers of World War II